The 1929 Ladies Open Championships was held at the Queen's Club, West Kensington in London from 23–28 January 1929.Nancy Cave won her second title defeating her sister Joyce Cave in the final.

Draw and results

References

Women's British Open Squash Championships
Women's British Open Squash Championships
Women's British Open Squash Championships
Women's British Open Squash Championships
Squash competitions in London
Women's British Open Squash Championships